The Democratic Party is a political party in Zambia. The party was launched in 1991.

Its current leader is Judith Phiri-Nkonge. Before October 2022, the leader was Harry Kalaba, who was the party's candidate for president in the 2021 Zambian general election. Before 2018, the party was led by Emmanuel Mubanga Mwamba.

Electoral history

Presidential elections

National Assembly elections

References 

1991 establishments in Zambia
Political parties established in 1991
Political parties in Zambia